Pāvels Davidovs (born 30 December 1980) is a Latvian former football goalkeeper.

Club career
Davidovs played for FK Avots until 2000, when he started his professional career with FK Ventspils in the Latvian Higher League. He made only one appearance through the season, being a total backup keeper. In 2002, he left FK Ventspils, going to a one level lower league and joining FK Auda in Riga. He played 10 matches there and in 2003 had a spell in Lithuania with FK Ekranas. In 2004, he came back to Latvia, signing a contract with Latvian Higher League club Dinaburg FC in Daugavpils. Also this time he couldn't capitalize in the league and played only one match. In 2005, he returned to FK Ventspils and stayed there for 2 seasons, mostly being the second-choice goalkeeper, and making 17 appearances. In 2008, he joined Daugava Daugavpils. Davidovs played there for one season and played 12 matches, before joining another team from the same city - Dinaburg FC again. He made 11 good appearances and had an offer in Belarus from FC Shakhtyor Soligorsk, that he couldn't reject. He played there for 2 years. In the second season he mostly played in the reserve team. At the start of 2011 he decided to terminate his contract with the club, and in March, after becoming a free agent, he signed a contract with Mash'al Mubarek, playing in the Uzbek League. He left the Uzbek side at the start of 2012, returning to Latvia and joining the Latvian Higher League club FC Jūrmala. He took the first-choice keeper's spot right after joining. Playing 14 league matches at the club, he once again left - this time for the Lithuanian A Lyga club FK Sūduva Marijampolė. Davidovs was the first choice keeper of Sūduva for two seasons, participating in the domestic competitions and the UEFA Europa League. Prior to the 2014 Latvian Higher League season he moved to FK Spartaks Jūrmala. During the first half of the season he was the first-choice keeper, but during the second one mostly served as the back-up for Vitālijs Meļņičenko.

Honours
 Champion of Latvia – 2006

References

External links
 
 

1980 births
Living people
Footballers from Riga
Latvian footballers
Association football goalkeepers
Latvian expatriate footballers
Expatriate footballers in Lithuania
Expatriate footballers in Belarus
Expatriate footballers in Uzbekistan
Latvian expatriate sportspeople in Lithuania
FK Ventspils players
FK Auda players
FK Ekranas players
Dinaburg FC players
FC Daugava players
FC Shakhtyor Soligorsk players
FK Mash'al Mubarek players
FC Jūrmala players
FK Sūduva Marijampolė players
FK Spartaks Jūrmala players
FC Smorgon players
BFC Daugavpils players